Lake Bernhardsthal (also: Bernhardsthaler Teich) is located in Bernhardsthal, the very north east corner of Lower Austria near the border with the Czech Republic. The lake has a size of approximately 0.5 km² and is free for bathing, fishing or boating.

Its clear, jade water is especially beautiful in spring. The Lake can also be reached from Hohenau an der March.

External links

Bernhardsthal